Ee Varasham Sakshiga (As a rain witness) is a 2014 Telugu romantic comedy film directed by Ramana Mogili. Rajendra Bharadwaj provided the screenplay and Nandamuri Hari did the editing for the film.  The film was released worldwide on 13 December 2014.

Plot
Jai (Varun Sandesh) meets a girl Mahalakshmi (Haripriya) in a train and falls in love with her in course of the journey. He accidentally attends a ceremony which turns out to be Mahalakshmi's engagement and is left heartbroken. But to his surprise, Mahalakshmi elopes with the groom whom she was engaged to along with Jai. They went to Hyderabad after knowing that the groom had loved a Muslim girl Jai and his friends successfully elopes with her then the fight ensues with the girl's father (Jeeva) in this process they successfully conduct their marriage this incident impresses Maha by Jai's actions. Later she accepts her family's marriage proposal for saving her father's reputation after knowing this Jai was heartbroken again. Later Maha realises she was loving meanwhile with his friends encouragement he comes to her hometown to confess his feelings on her.

In the meeting they both got confess their feelings on each other suddenly they elope again. Jai asks about her father, Maha reveals that actually her father gave idea to leave the marriage. Then after reaching Hyderabad they meet again the Muslim girls father who avenges on them but suddenly he got a call from his parties high command that he got MLA seat for upcoming elections because of his daughter's marriage then he forgot his revenge and leaves them. Later Jai's friends reveals to them that the call was a hoax which called by them to save them. Then the film ends with all are chased by the gang.

Cast
Varun Sandesh as Jai
Hariprriya as Mahalakshmi
Honey Rose
Chalapathi Rao
Delhi Rajeswari
Kasi Viswanathan
Hema
Dhanraj
Venu Madhav
Prabhas Sreenu

Soundtrack 
Music of the film was composed by Anil Gopi Reddy.

Reviews
123 Telugu gave the film 2.25 stars stating, "Varun Sandesh’s performance and an ok first half are the only plus points of this film, which is otherwise quite boring and can easily be ignored this weekend".

References

External links 
 

2010s Telugu-language films
Indian romantic comedy films